Danijela Stefanović (Serbian Cyrillic: проф. др Данијела Стефановић) is a member of the faculty of philosophy at the University of Belgrade, specializing in the history of ancient Egypt and Greece.

Selected works
The Title mr t3-mḥw in the Middle Kingdom Documents (Serbian Archaeological Society, 2003).
The holders of regular military titles in the period of the Middle Kingdom (Golden House, 2006).
The non-royal regular feminine titles of the Middle Kingdom and Second Intermediate Period: dossiers (Golden House, 2009).
Dossiers of Ancient Egyptians - the Middle Kingdom and Second Intermediate Period: addition to Franke's 'Personendaten'. With Wolfram Grajetzki (GHP Egyptology 19. London: Golden House Publications. 2012. , 9781906137298
I beše poput ptice u kavezu. Studija o istoriji i kulturi Starog istoka (Glasnik, 2012)
(Austro-)German Words in Serbian. With Helmut Satzinger (Narodna Biblioteka Srbije Beograd, 1914)
Dossiers of Ancient Egyptian Women. The Middle Kingdom and Second Intermediate Period. (Middle Kingdom Studies 5). London 2016. .
 Stelae of the Middle Kingdom and the Second Intermediate Period: Ägyptisches Museum und Papyrussammlung, Staatliche Museen zu Berlin, with Helmut Satzinger, London

References

Year of birth missing (living people)
Living people
Academic staff of the University of Belgrade
Serbian Egyptologists
21st-century Serbian women writers